NGC 1042 is a spiral galaxy located in the constellation
Cetus. The galaxy has an apparent magnitude of 14.0.

Nearby galaxies

The galaxy appears near the spiral galaxy NGC 1035 in the sky, and both have similar redshifts.  The two objects may therefore be physically associated with each other.

References

External links
 
 Picture of NGC 1042
 

Intermediate spiral galaxies
Cetus (constellation)
1042
10122